Tawala is an Oceanic language of the Milne Bay Province, Papua New Guinea. It is spoken by 20,000 people who live in hamlets and small villages on the East Cape peninsula, on the shores of Milne Bay and on areas of the islands of Sideia and Basilaki. There are approximately 40 main centres of population each speaking the same dialect, although through the process of colonisation some centres have gained more prominence than others.

Phonology
Tawala has a consonant inventory of nineteen consonants, an average vowel quality inventory of five vowels, and an also average consonant-vowel ratio of three.

Consonants 

 may have a fricative quality  when between low vowels.

Vowels 

Syntax

Non-verbal clauses 
Tawala, like many Austronesian languages, makes frequent use of non-verbal constructions and phrases. This means sentences lacking verbs, not sentences being unspoken. In these situations, the verbs are simply implied by the subject, object, and context. Following are a couple simple examples of non-verbal clauses: in all there is no copula nor verb:

Demonstratives 
There are three demonstratives in Tawala. All three are stressed emphatic free form words which can function as spatial deictics, and two can also be used as demonstrative pronouns. Well established in the freedom of their use, they frequently occur as the only word in non-verbal sentences.

Spatial deictics 
Tawala has three demonstrative spatial deictics:

Tawala's demonstratives can appear in non-verbal sentences where their function is predicative and there is no subject. Following is the simplest example of this permutation:

Each demonstrative also has a semi-reduplicated form which repeats the first syllable: -, -, -. The reduplicated form specifies exact location or time. For example, this non-verbal sentence is taken from a letter; hence the form here parallels the written original:

The demonstrative may also be marked for directional deixis – near the hearer:

Referential pronouns 
While all three demonstratives function as spatial deictics, two also have a referential function as demonstrative pronouns.

Demonstratives typically precede and modify nouns:

They may function as heads of full noun phrases (NP):

The demonstrative  is used as a complementizer:

When speakers end their discussion they often conclude with the following nonverbal clause:

Demonstratives function within discourse to maintain topic and prominence; they can be placed at the end of a NP as well, where they indicate topicalisation. Topicalisation is very common across both verbal and non-verbal sentences. The neutral demonstrative  is commonly used in complex sentences to this end, but both neutral and proximal terms are applicable:

Topicalisation can also occur with a demonstrative in the following phrase, so that two demonstratives are used consecutively:

And a longer example of demonstrative pronouns:

Phonological history 
Tawala demonstratives are reflexes of the small set of demonstratives found in Proto-Oceanic (POC):  designating 'near speaker',  designating 'near addressee', and  designating 'distant from both speaker and addressee'. The Tawala reflexes have experienced both phonological and semantic change through time and geographic shifts but remain clearly descended from POC. The origin of the suffix  is not known, though it is also found with spatial interrogative  'where' and the conjunction , and similar suffixes may be found across Pacific languages.

The neutral form  includes the POC meaning of 'near hearer', overlapping the meaning of the proximal form . Speakers can thus use deictic forms appropriate to themselves or their hearers.

Comparison to neighboring languages 
Though it can feature demonstratives following nouns, Tawala is primarily a demonstrative-noun order language. This order is typical of languages in the immediate vicinity like Saliba and Wedau, which are also closely related; however, languages surrounding the mainland area of the Milne Bay Province are predominantly noun-demonstrative order and Trans-New-Guinean. This may suggest a historic localized transit of Papuan Tip languages to the province.

Data on distance-contrast in spatial deictics in the area of Tawala is less prevalent; however, three-way contrast, as present in Tawala, appears common to the Milne Bay Province, and three-way distinction is generally more common in Pacific languages as a whole. There are less defined borders between languages of two- and three-way contrast in the Papuan Tip than for d-n order, however.

Negation 
In Tawala, negation is most commonly shown through the negative particle , which always appears before the predicate of a clause. When the initial vowel is lengthened, forming , the negative particle is taken as the predicate of an existential clause, or as an interjection/response to indicate 'no'.

Ex. (1) Negation using 

Ex. (2) Negative existential predicate, 

Ex. (3) Negative response, 

The negative particle can also take the future tense marker  as a prefix to form a negative adverb . This construction combines with the irrealis and potential mood across both verbal and non-verbal clauses.

Ex. (4) Negative non-verbal clause in irrealis mood

Ex. (5) Negative verbal clause in irrealis mood

Intensified negation 
Negation can be intensified by adopting the condition marker  as a suffix to the negative particle ; however, this construction appears to be limited to the use of response or interjection.

Ex. (6) Intensified negation

Negation of non-verbal clauses 
As Tawala allows for both verbal and non-verbal clauses, the negative particle will never occur within a clause level noun phrase. For example, if the negative particle were placed between a noun and an adjective, then both would be considered constituents of the clause, with the adjective fulfilling the function of the predicate. The following example illustrates this kind of construction.

Ex. (7) Negation of descriptive clause

Negation of non-verbal clauses: existential clauses 
Existential clauses are common non-verbal clauses which occur within spoken Tawala, though they only occasionally occur within extended discourse. In Tawala, an existential clause consists of a nominal predicate and can often be negated by the addition of the negative particle that precedes the predicate.

Ex. (8) Negation of existential clause

Most negative existential clauses cannot be made positive by simply removing the negative particle; a stative clause would be required instead. The below example illustrates this asymmetry.
Ex. (9) Asymmetry of positive and negative existential clauses

Negative existential clauses are constructed in the irrealis mood when the negative adverb precedes the existential nominal predicate, as shown in example (4).

As mentioned earlier, the negative particle can be taken as the predicate of an existential clause. This construction is used when asking polar questions. The second clause in the following example illustrates its use.

Ex. (10) Negative existential predicate in polar question

Negation of non-verbal clauses: Descriptive clauses 
Descriptive non-verbal clauses, where an adjective acts as the predicate of the clause, are not often constructed in the negative. In the instances where this does occur, it implies that the negative condition is permanent.

Ex. (11) Negation of descriptive clause

Negation of non-verbal clauses: possessive clauses 
As Tawala always places the negative before the predicate and never within a noun phrase, if a negative particle is found between two nouns, it indicates a possessive clause. Compare the example below, which combines an equative and possessive clause.

Ex. (12) Negation of possessive clause

Negation of verbal clauses 
Negation of verbal clauses in Tawala follow the same rules applied to non-verbal clauses: for clauses in the past or present tense, the negative particle precedes the predicate, while the negative tense adverb precedes the predicate for clauses in the future tense. These clauses will either carry the irrealis, potential or hypothetical mood.

Ex. (13) Negative durative irrealis 

Ex. (14) Past irrealis

Ex. (15) Hypothetical 

Ex. (16) Negative durative potential

Ex. (17) Future potential

Negation of verbal clauses: prohibitions 
Prohibitive constructions within Tawala are constructed by placing the negative tense adverb before a verbal predicate, as illustrated in the example below.

Ex (18). Prohibitive command

Morphology

Pronouns
Tawala distinguishes three persons: first, second and third. There are only two grammatical numbers, singular and plural, although first person plural makes a distinction between inclusive and exclusive.

Although there are five classes of pronouns in Tawala, only the independent pronoun class should be considered as pronouns proper as they are the only class consisting of free forms. The remaining four classes occur with independent pronouns in a phrase.

Independent pronouns

Subject prefix and object enclitic
Subject prefixes and object enclitics attach to a verb to mark person and number of both subject and object respectively.

Example:
The following example demonstrates the use of some of the above personal pronouns in context.

Possession
Tawala distinguishes alienable and inalienable possession.

Possessive pronouns
Alienable possession is constructed by a free-standing possessive pronoun that marks the person and number of the possessor.

Example:
The following examples demonstrate the use of some of the above personal pronouns in context.

Pronominal enclitics
Inalienable possession is constructed by attaching a pronominal enclitic to the possessed noun.

Example:
The following example demonstrates the use of some of the above personal pronouns in context.

References

Bibliography

External links 

 Paradisec has a number of collections with Tawala materials, including two collections of Arthur Cappell's materials (AC1, AC2).

Nuclear Papuan Tip languages
Languages of Milne Bay Province